Illinois Route 150 (IL 150) is a  east–west state road in southern Illinois. It runs from the Chester Bridge, a truss bridge over the Mississippi River to Route 51 in the state of Missouri, to IL 154 in rural Perry County well west of Pinckneyville.

Route description

Illinois 150 generally runs southwest to northeast, but is marked as an east–west route. From the Chester Bridge, it runs northeast through Chester, briefly overlapping Illinois Route 3. A longer concurrency takes place further northeast at Illinois Route 4. East of Percy, Illinois 150 turns north to Illinois 154.  In Chester, it is named State Street.

History
SBI Route 150 originally ran from the US 51/60/62 bridges south of Cairo north to Hamel (located northeast of Saint Louis, Missouri) on what is now Illinois Route 3, the portion of Illinois 150 from Chester to Steeleville, and Illinois Route 4.

In 1937, the changes from Illinois 150 to Illinois 3 and 4 took place (the change to Illinois 4 initially was a change to Illinois Route 43). Illinois 150 then was extended east and west (replacing what was then Illinois Route 151) to its current length.

Major intersections

References

External links

150
Transportation in Perry County, Illinois
Transportation in Randolph County, Illinois